Datta Rane is a leader of Bharatiya Janata Party. He is a former cabinet minister in Government of Maharashtra. He was elected to Maharashtra Legislative Assembly  from Shivadi constituency.

References

Living people
Year of birth missing (living people)
Maharashtra MLAs 1995–1999
State cabinet ministers of Maharashtra
Politicians from Mumbai
Maharashtra MLAs 1990–1995
Marathi politicians
Bharatiya Janata Party politicians from Maharashtra